1902 in Argentine football saw Alumni win its 3rd consecutive league championship. Barracas Athletic (promoted in 1901) added to the tournament.

In international football, the Argentina national team played its first official game ever, a 6-0 win against Uruguay in Montevideo.

Primera División

The first division championship was expanded to a 5-team league format, with each team playing the other twice.

Final standings

Lower divisions

Primera B
Champion: Barracas A.C. II

Primera C
Champion: Lomas Juniors

International cup

Tie Cup
Champion:  Rosario AC

Playoffs

Argentina national team
The Argentina national team played its second match ever, a 6–0 win against Uruguay in front of 8,000 spectators in the Paso del Molino stadium in Montevideo.

Lineup: 
José Buruca Laforia (Barracas AC), William Leslie (Quilmes), Walter Buchanan (Alumni), Eduardo Duggan (Belgrano AC), Carlos Buchanan (Alumni), Ernesto Brown (Alumni), Edward Morgan (Quilmes), Juan Moore (captain) (Alumni), Juan Anderson (Lomas AC), Carlos Dickinson (Belgrano AC), Jorge Brown (Alumni)

Results

References

 
Seasons in Argentine football
Argentine